The 1940 Massachusetts gubernatorial election was held on November 5, 1940.

Republican primary

Governor
Incumbent Governor Leverett Saltonstall was unopposed for re-election.

Results

Lieutenant Governor
Incumbent Lieutenant Governor Horace Cahill was unopposed for re-election.

Results

Democratic primary

Governor

Candidates

Declared
 Paul Dever, Massachusetts Attorney General
 Francis E. Kelly, former Lieutenant Governor

Results

Lieutenant Governor

Candidates

Declared
 John C. Carr, Mayor of Medford
 Owen A. Gallagher, former State Senator
 Francis P. Kelley
 Michael P. McCarron
 Charles E. O'Neil
 Raymond A. Willett

Governor

Lt. Governor

See also
 1939 Massachusetts legislature

References

Bibliography

Further reading
 

Governor
1940
Massachusetts
November 1940 events